Oxelösund Municipality held a municipal election on 17 September 2006 as part of the local elections. This was held on the same day as the general election.

Results
The number of seats remained at 31 with the Social Democrats winning the most at 14, a drop of one from 2002. There were 6,883 valid ballots cast.

Electoral wards
All electoral wards were located within the Oxelösund urban area in a single constituency.

References

Oxelösund
Oxelösund municipal elections